The Conflict Studies Research Centre (CSRC), was a component of the Defence Academy of the United Kingdom, based at Shrivenham, Oxfordshire. It specialised in potential causes of conflict in a wide area ranging from the Baltics to Central Asia.

This geographical focus was inherited from the Centre's original incarnation as the Soviet Studies Research Centre (SSRC) in 1972, at Royal Military Academy Sandhurst, examining the Soviet military threat.  was an original red team which interpreted Soviet bloc "thinking and attitudes" at Camberley. The organization was renamed from Soviet studies to Conflict studies in 1993 – after the dissolution of the Soviet Union. The Centre later examined wider issues including foreign policy, energy security and demographic change.

CSRC hosted a small number of deep country specialists, providing in-house expertise on their subject countries to government and academic customers in the UK and beyond, as well as publishing research in their own right.

In 2006, CSRC was absorbed into the Advanced Research and Assessment Group (ARAG), another component of the UK Defence Academy, which was subsequently disbanded.

In May 2010, former research staff of CSRC, laid off at its closure, re-formed the organisation independently of the Ministry of Defence. CSRC is now an independent, privately funded body providing expertise in security issues with a primary focus on relations with Russia, and specialist knowledge on military, domestic political, and cyber security questions.

References

External links

Defence Academy CSRC website and publications listing
Defence Academy College of Management and Technology CSRC page

Defunct public bodies of the United Kingdom
Military of the United Kingdom